Trilocha pallescens is a moth in the family Bombycidae. It was described by Schaus in 1921. It is found in Brazil.

References

Natural History Museum Lepidoptera generic names catalog

Bombycidae
Moths described in 1921